Georgi Enisheynov (12 April 1929 - 7 November 2002) was a Bulgarian footballer who played as a defender. For 10 seasons he made 146 league appearances for CSKA Sofia.

Honours

Club
CSKA Sofia
 Bulgarian A Group (9): 1951, 1952, 1954, 1955, 1956, 1957, 1958, 1958–59, 1959–60
 Bulgarian Cup (3): 1951, 1954, 1955

References

1929 births
2002 deaths
Bulgarian footballers
Bulgaria international footballers
Botev Plovdiv players
PFC Marek Dupnitsa players
PFC CSKA Sofia players
First Professional Football League (Bulgaria) players
Association football defenders
People from Dupnitsa
Sportspeople from Kyustendil Province